Vera Nunes, stage name of Isaura Nunes Martins Henriques (12 August 1928 – 2 February 2021), was a Brazilian actress.

Biography
Henriques studied accounting in her youth, although she had a passion for the arts. She became a radiographer at the age of 13 for the Ministry of Education alongside José Vasconcelos and Fernanda Montenegro. She spent some time in Argentina to shoot No me digas adiós and returned to Brazil to shoot Falta alguém no manicômio. She also opened a theatre company at the Teatro Cultura Artística in São Paulo.

Nunes was hired by TV Paulista in 1951, which would soon end her film career. She last appeared in a film in the 1957 flick Dorinha no soçaite, and subsequently focused on television. She married actor Altamiro Martins in 1961, who died in 2005.

Vera Nunes died in Campinas on 2 February 2021, at the age of 92.

Filmography

Cinema
Não Me Digas Adeus (1948)
Falta Alguém no Manicômio (1948)
Uma Luz na Estrada (1948)
 (1948)
Também Somos Irmãos (1949)
Pinguinho de Gente (1949)
Garota Mineira (1950)
Um Beijo Roubado (1950)
 (1951)
 (1951)
Custa Pouco a Felicidade (1952)
Armas da Vingança (1955)
Dorinha no Soçaite (1957)
A Quarta Parada (2003)
Tal Pai Tal Filho (2004)
Autofagia (2007)
O Profeta (2008)

Television
 (1952)
 (1952)
As Aventuras de Suzana (1953)
O Casal Mais Feliz do Mundo (1955)
Estúdio 13 (1959)
 (1959)
 (1964)
As minas de prata (1966)
Os Fantoches (1967)
 (1968)
 (1969)
 (1969)
 (1969)
O Meu Pé de Laranja Lima (1970)
 (1975)
O Meu Pé de Laranja Lima (1980)
 (1982)
 (1985)

References

External links 

1928 births
2021 deaths
Brazilian actresses
Actresses from Rio de Janeiro (city)